Nora Bernard (September 22, 1935 – December 26, 2007) was a Canadian Mi'kmaq activist who sought compensation for survivors of the Canadian Indian residential school system. She was directly responsible for what became the largest class-action lawsuit in Canadian history, representing an estimated 79,000 survivors; the Canadian government settled the lawsuit in 2005 for upwards of 5 billion dollars.

In 1945, when Bernard was nine years old, her mother was told that if she did not sign the consent forms to send her children to a residential school, the child welfare system would take her children into "protective custody"; as a result, Bernard attended the Shubenacadie Indian Residential School for five years. In 1955, she married a non-native man, and consequently lost her legal status under the Indian Act; the relevant section of the Indian Act was repealed in 1985, but this did not automatically lead to reinstatement as a band member, and it was not until March 2007 that she was voted back into the Millbrook First Nation.

In 1995, Bernard began an organization to represent survivors of the Shubenacadie school; she subsequently convinced Halifax lawyer John McKiggan to represent the Shubenacadie survivors in a class-action suit. After the Shubenacadie suit became public knowledge, many other survivors' associations across Canada filed similar suits; these were eventually amalgamated into one national lawsuit. In McKiggan's words, "(...) if it wasn't for Nora's efforts, and other survivors like her across Canada, this national settlement never would have happened. (...) After we filed our lawsuit, a number of other students from other schools filed similar class actions."

In 2005, she testified before the House of Commons of Canada about the abuse children suffered in residential schools:

On December 27, 2007, Bernard was found dead in her home in Truro, Nova Scotia; although she was originally thought to have died of natural causes, on December 31, police arrested her grandson James Douglas Gloade and charged him with her murder. She had been stabbed to death. On January 23, 2009, Gloade was convicted of manslaughter and sentenced to 15 years in prison.

In 2008 Bernard was posthumously awarded the Order of Nova Scotia. 

In December 2022, Halifax council voted to rename Cornwallis Street, in the city's north end, after Nora Bernard. The neighbouring Mi'kmaw Native Friendship Centre and New Horizons Baptist Church had earlier called on council to rename the street, which commemorated  Edward Cornwallis, a British governor who sought to drive the Mi'kmaq out of the Nova Scotia peninsula and proclaimed that a bounty would be paid for the scalps of Mi'kmaw people. Halifax council convened a special committee to advise on the matter of municipal assets commemorating Cornwallis. The task force recommended renaming the street. "Nora Bernard Street" topped a public poll of potential new street names.

See also 
 Nova Scotia Heritage Day

References

1935 births
2007 deaths
20th-century First Nations people
21st-century First Nations people
Canadian activists
Canadian women activists
Members of the Order of Nova Scotia
Mi'kmaq people
People murdered in Nova Scotia
Sipekneꞌkatik First Nation
20th-century Canadian women